Ted Potter (born 11 November 1944) is a former Australian rules footballer. A key defender, he was a regular in the Collingwood Magpies side throughout the 1960s.

He is remembered for being the player whose supposedly wayward handball was intercepted by Barry Breen that resulted in the winning point for St Kilda in the 1966 VFL Grand Final; however, this is a misnomer, as the ball spilled free and was never actually handballed.

He retired in 1972 with 182 games to his name, the most ever by a player without scoring a goal.

References

External links

Collingwood Forever Profile

1944 births
Australian rules footballers from Victoria (Australia)
Collingwood Football Club players
Greensborough Football Club players
Living people